The 1927–28 FA Cup was the 53rd staging of the world's oldest football cup competition, the Football Association Challenge Cup, commonly known as the FA Cup. Blackburn Rovers won the competition for the sixth and (as of 2017) final time, beating Huddersfield Town 3–1 in the final at Wembley.

Matches were scheduled to be played at the stadium of the team named first on the date specified for each round, which was always a Saturday. Some matches, however, might be rescheduled for other days if there were clashes with games for other competitions or the weather was inclement. If scores were level after 90 minutes had been played, a replay would take place at the stadium of the second-named team later the same week. If the replayed match was drawn further replays would be held until a winner was determined. If scores were level after 90 minutes had been played in a replay, a 30-minute period of extra time would be played.

Calendar

First round proper
At this stage 40 clubs from the Football League Third Division North and South joined the 25 non-league clubs who came through the qualifying rounds. Of those Third Division sides not playing in the First Round Proper, Millwall and Brentford were given a bye to the Third Round, Barrow were entered into the Fourth Qualifying Round (losing 3–1 to Workington), and Torquay United were not involved at any stage of the competition. To make the number of matches up, non-league Northfleet United, Aberdare Athletic and Leyton were given byes to this round. 34 matches were scheduled to be played on Saturday, 26 November 1927. Six matches were drawn and went to replays in the following midweek fixture.

Second round proper
The matches were played on Saturday, 10 December 1927. Two matches were drawn, with replays taking place in the following midweek fixture.

Third round proper
The 44 First and Second Division clubs, entered the competition at this stage, along with Third Division Millwall and Brentford. Also given a bye to this round of the draw were amateur side Corinthian. The matches were scheduled for Saturday, 14 January 1928. Three matches were drawn and went to replays in the following midweek fixture.

Fourth round proper
The matches were scheduled for Saturday, 28 January 1928. Three games were drawn and went to replays in the following midweek fixture.

Fifth Round Proper
The matches were scheduled for Saturday, 18 February 1928. There was one replay, played in the next midweek fixture.

Sixth Round Proper
The four quarter-final ties were scheduled to be played on Saturday, 3 March 1928. There were no replays.

Semi-finals
The semi-final matches were played on Saturday, 24 March 1928. The Huddersfield Town–Sheffield United local derby tie went to two replays before it was settled in Huddersfield's favour. Huddersfield went on to meet Blackburn Rovers in the final at Wembley.

Replay

Replay

Final

The 1928 FA Cup Final was contested by Blackburn Rovers and Huddersfield Town at Wembley. Blackburn won 3–1, with goals from Jack Roscamp (2) and Tommy McLean. Alex Jackson scored Huddersfield's goal, making this the first final in 18 years where both teams scored.

Match details

See also
FA Cup Final Results 1872-

External links
Official site; fixtures and results service at TheFA.com
1927-28 FA Cup at rssf.com
1927-28 FA Cup at soccerbase.com

FA Cup seasons
FA
Cup